Petter Hugsted (11 July 1921 – 19 May 2000) was a Norwegian ski jumper who won the gold medal in the individual large hill event at the 1948 Olympics.

Hugsted won junior competition at the Holmenkollen ski festival in 1940. His career was impeded during World War II, when he was held in the Grini concentration camp during the German occupation of Norway. After the war he placed third at the Holmenkollen in 1947 and 1948, in the senior category. He won the ski jumping competition at Lahti in 1947 and the Open U.S. Championships in Salt Lake City in 1949. He retired in 1951 after finishing 13th at Holmenkollen.

Besides skiing Hugsted played association football for the national B-team. He lived his whole life in Kongsberg, and  devoted much energy to the creation and curatorship of the Kongsberg Skiing Museum, together with his friend and fellow ski jumper Birger Ruud.

References

External links 

 1952 photograph
 

1921 births
2000 deaths
Norwegian male ski jumpers
Olympic ski jumpers of Norway
Olympic gold medalists for Norway
Norwegian footballers
Ski jumpers at the 1948 Winter Olympics
Grini concentration camp survivors
Olympic medalists in ski jumping
Medalists at the 1948 Winter Olympics
Kongsberg IF ski jumpers
People from Kongsberg
Association footballers not categorized by position
Sportspeople from Viken (county)
20th-century Norwegian people